Van Morrison (born George Ivan Morrison on 31 August 1945) is a Northern Irish singer-songwriter who has been a professional musician since 1960. He has won six Grammy awards and was inducted into the Songwriter's Hall of Fame in 2003. Morrison began to write and record his first original songs while frontman for the band Them and in the years since has written hundreds of songs, many of them covered by popular and major artists.

In 2012, Paste compiled a list of covers by Glen Hansard, Jeff Buckley, The Doors, Tom Petty and the Heartbreakers, Elvis Costello, Ben E. King, Solomon Burke, Michael Bublé, Sinéad O'Connor and Bruce Springsteen as their pick of the 10 Best Covers of Van Morrison Songs.

This article is a selective list of prominent musicians or entertainers who have recorded their own version of a song which Van Morrison originally wrote and recorded. There are also some notable or frequently performed live versions included.

A

The Allman Brothers Band
 And It Stoned Me
 Into the Mystic

John Anderson
 Brown Eyed Girl

B

Michael Ball
 Have I Told You Lately

The Band
 Caravan with Van Morrison – (The Last Waltz)
 4% Pantomime (co-written with Robbie Robertson)

Eric Bell
 Gloria
 Madame George

Michael Bolton
 Crazy Love

Bon Jovi
 Gloria (Medley)

Boney M.
 I Shall Sing

Bono
 Moondance

Chris Botti
 Moondance

David Bowie
 Gloria

Greg Brown
 Moondance

Jackson Browne
 Into the Mystic

Michael Bublé
 Crazy Love
 Moondance

Jeff Buckley
 Madame George
 Sweet Thing
 The Way Young Lovers Do

Jimmy Buffett
 Brown Eyed Girl

Solomon Burke
 Fast Train
 Only a Dream

Sam Bush
 Hungry For Your Love

Busted
 Brown Eyed Girl

C

David Campbell
 Jackie Wilson Said (I'm in Heaven When You Smile)

Kim Carnes
 Warm Love

Vikki Carr
 Crazy Love

Paul Carrack
 Crazy Love
 Into the Mystic

Dina Carroll
 Someone Like You

Jen Chapin
 Into the Mystic

Ray Charles duet with Van Morrison
 Crazy Love

C. J. Chenier
 Comfort You

The Chieftains with Van Morrison
 Boffyflow and Spike
 Celtic Ray
 Have I Told You Lately
 Irish Heartbeat

Joe Cocker
 Into the Mystic

Shawn Colvin
 Someone Like You

Billy Connolly
Irish Heartbeat

Rita Coolidge
 Crazy Love

Elvis Costello
 Full Force Gale
 Wild Night

Counting Crows
 Caravan

Cristina
 Blue Money

Billy Ray Cyrus
 Brown Eyed Girl

D

The Dead
 Gloria
 Into the Mystic

Dexys Midnight Runners
Jackie Wilson Said (I'm in Heaven When You Smile)

Jackie DeShannon
 And It Stoned Me
 Flamingos Fly
 I Wanna Roo You
 Santa Fe
 Sweet Sixteen co-written with Van Morrison
 The Wonder of You with Van Morrison

Bo Diddley
 I've Been Working

Cara Dillon
 Crazy Love

Joe Dolan
 Have I Told You Lately

Bob Dylan
 And It Stoned Me with Van Morrison
 Carrying a Torch
 Crazy Love with Van Morrison
 One Irish Rover with Van Morrison
 Foreign Window with Van Morrison
 Tupelo Honey

E

Pee Wee Ellis
 I Will Be There (with Van Morrison)

Energy Orchard
 Gloria
 Madame George
 One Two Brown Eyes (Van Morrison with Them song)

Everclear
 Brown Eyed Girl

F

Marianne Faithfull
 Madame George

Georgie Fame
 Moondance

Chris Farlowe
 Sitting on Top of the World (with Van Morrison)

Bryan Ferry
 Crazy Love

Tom Fogerty
 Real Real Gone

G

Jerry Garcia Band
 And It Stoned Me
 Bright Side of the Road
 Crazy Love
 He Ain't Give You None
 Tupelo Honey

Art Garfunkel
I Shall Sing

Kathie Lee Gifford
 Moondance

Gov't Mule
 And It Stoned Me

Grateful Dead
 Gloria

Green Day
 Brown Eyed Girl

H

Sammy Hagar
 Flamingos Fly

Richie Havens
 Tupelo Honey
 Wild Night

Goldie Hawn
 I Wanna Roo You

Roy Head
 Bit By Bit
 You've Got the Power

Jimi Hendrix
 Gloria

Robyn Hitchcock
 Fair Play (live)
 Linden Arden Stole the Highlights (live)

John Lee Hooker
 T.B. Sheets
 The Healing Game with Van Morrison
 Gloria with Van Morrison

Hothouse Flowers
 Bright Side of the Road

Engelbert Humperdinck
 Have I Told You Lately

I

Iggy Pop
 Gloria
 One Two Brown Eyes (Van Morrison with Them song)

J

Colin James
 Into the Mystic
 I Will Be There
 It Fills You Up

Aled Jones
Whenever God Shines His Light

Paul Jones
 Philosopher's Stone

Rickie Lee Jones
 Gloria

Tom Jones
 Carrying a Torch
 I'm Not Feeling It Anymore
 It Must Be You
 Some Peace of Mind
 Sometimes We Cry with Van Morrison

K

Phil Keaggy
 When Will I Ever Learn To Live in God

Ronan Keating
 Brown Eyed Girl

Brian Kennedy
 Crazy Love
 Irish Heartbeat with Shana Morrison
 Queen of the Slipstream

Ben E. King
 Into the Mystic

L

Frankie Laine
 Brand New Day

Ute Lemper
 Moondance

Jerry Lee Lewis with Don Henley
 What Makes the Irish Heart Beat

Ramsey Lewis and Nancy Wilson
 Moondance

M

Miriam Makeba
 Brand New Day
 I Shall Sing

Barry Manilow
 Have I Told You Lately

Barbara Mandrell
 Have I Told You Lately

Martina McBride
Wild Night

Michael McDonald
 Into the Mystic

Bobby McFerrin
 Moondance

Maria McKee
 My Lonely Sad Eyes
 The Way Young Lovers Do

Brian McKnight
 Crazy Love

John Mellencamp
 Wild Night

Jonathan Rhys Meyers
 Moondance

James Morrison
 And It Stoned Me

Jim Morrison with The Doors
 Gloria

Bill Murray with Eric Clapton
 Gloria (Crossroads Guitar Festival – 2007)

N

Aaron Neville and Robbie Robertson
 Crazy Love

Liam Neeson
 Coney Island

Ted Nugent
 Gloria

O

Sinéad O'Connor
 Have I Told You Lately with Van Morrison and The Chieftains
 You Make Me Feel So Free

P

Robert Pattinson
 I'll Be Your Lover, Too

Tom Petty and the Heartbreakers
 Gloria
 I'm Tired Joey Boy
 Mystic Eyes

Esther Phillips
 Brand New Day
 Crazy Love
 Into the Mystic

R

Della Reese
 Have I Told You Lately

Martha Reeves
 Wild Night

Helen Reddy
 Crazy Love

Buddy Rich
 Domino

Cliff Richard
Whenever God Shines His Light with Van Morrison

Johnny Rivers
 Brown Eyed Girl
 Into the Mystic
 Slim Slo Slider
 Wild Night
 Songwriter

Kenny Rogers
 Have I Told You Lately

S

Bob Seger
 I've Been Working

Bon Scott with The Spektors
 Gloria

Shakira
 Bright Side of the Road – (President Barack Obama's Neighborhood Ball, 2009)

Patti Smith
 Gloria

Phoebe Snow
 Madame George

Dusty Springfield
 Tupelo Honey

Rick Springfield
 Gloria

Bruce Springsteen
 Brown Eyed Girl
 Gloria

Joe Stampley
 Brown Eyed Girl

Lisa Stansfield
 Friday's Child (Van Morrison with Them Song)

Steel Pulse
 Brown Eyed Girl

Rod Stewart
 Crazy Love
 Have I Told You Lately

The Swell Season (Glen Hansard with Markéta Irglová)
 And the Healing Has Begun (Glen Hansard)
 Astral Weeks
 Into the Mystic (Glen Hansard with Markéta Irglová)
 Sweet Thing

T

13th Floor Elevators
 Gloria

Grady Tate
 Moondance

Corey Taylor
I'll Be Your Lover, Too

Toots and the Maytals
 I Shall Sing

U

U2
 Brown Eyed Girl
 Gloria
 Into the Mystic
 Moondance

W

The Wallflowers
 Into the Mystic

The Waterboys
 And the Healing Has Begun
 Sweet Thing

Russell Watson
 Have I Told You Lately

Widespread Panic
 And It Stoned Me
 Send Your Mind

Andy Williams
 Have I Told You Lately (also live at the Royal Albert Hall, 2007)

Vanessa L. Williams
 Someone Like You

Cassandra Wilson
 Tupelo Honey

Z

Warren Zevon
 Into the Mystic

Unreleased songs covered by other artists

Solomon Burke
 At the Crossroads

Tom Fogerty
 You Move Me

Johnny Winter
 Feedback Out on Highway 101

References

Morrison
Van Morrison